Tommaso M. Valletti is Professor of Economics at Imperial College Business School, and also Professor of Economics at the University of Rome Tor Vergata (Italy). He is a Fellow of CEPR. He is a Non-Executive Director to the board of the Financial Conduct Authority in London.

He was the Chief Competition Economist of the European Commission's Directorate General for Competition (DG COMP) in Brussels between September 2016 and August 2019.

In the period 2010-2012 he held the chair in “Innovation and Regulation of Digital Services” at Telecom ParisTech and Ecole Polytechnique in Paris. He was Joint Academic Director of the Brussels-based Centre for Regulation in Europe.

Valletti ranks among the top 2% of economists registered on IDEAS/RePEc.

References

Living people
Italian economists
Academics of Imperial College London
Alumni of the London School of Economics
Academic staff of the University of Rome Tor Vergata
Year of birth missing (living people)